Fukomys livingstoni is a species of is a species of mole rat that can be found in Africa.

It is named after Dr David Livingstone.

References

livingstoni
Mammals described in 2017
Fauna of Africa